Gershom ben Judah, (c. 960 -1040) best known as Rabbeinu Gershom ("Our teacher Gershom") and also commonly known to scholars of Judaism by the title Rabbeinu Gershom Me'Or Hagolah ("Our teacher Gershom the light of the exile"), was a famous Talmudist and Halakhist.

Less than a century after Gershom's death Rashi said of him, "all members of the Ashkenazi diaspora are students of his."  As early as the 14th century, Asher ben Jehiel wrote that Rabbeinu Gershom's writings were "such permanent fixtures that they may well have been handed down on Mount Sinai."

He is most famous for the synod he called around 1000 CE, in which he instituted various laws and bans, including prohibiting polygamy, requiring the consent of both parties to a divorce, modifying the rules concerning those who became apostates under compulsion, and prohibiting the opening of correspondence addressed to someone else.

Biography 

Born in Metz in 960, Gershom was a student of Yehuda HaKohen ben Meir (Sir Léontin), who was one of the greatest authorities of his time. Having lost his first wife, Gershom married a widow named Bonna and settled at Mainz, where he devoted himself to teaching the Talmud. During his lifetime Mainz became a center of Torah and Jewish scholarship for many Jewish communities in Europe that had formerly been connected with the Babylonian . He was the spiritual guide of the fledgling Ashkenazic Jewish communities and was very influential in molding them at a time when their population was dwindling.

Students came from all over Europe to enroll in his yeshiva, and later dispersed among various communities in Germany and beyond which helped spread Jewish learning. He had many pupils from different countries, like Eleazar ben Isaac, Jacob ben Yakar, Elijah ben Menahem, and Isaac ben Eliezer Halevi. The fame of his learning eclipsed even that of the heads of the academies of Sura (city) and Pumbedita. His life conformed to his teachings. He had a son, who forsook his religion at the time of the expulsion of the Jews from Mainz in 1012. When his son converted to become a Christian, R. Gershom grieved and observed the strictures of mourning for seven days (and another seven days mourning when his son died). However, he did apparently rule leniently regarding those who had submitted to baptism to escape persecution, and who afterward returned to the Jewish fold. He strictly prohibited reproaching them with infidelity, and even gave those among them who had been slandered an opportunity to publicly pronounce the benediction in the synagogues.

Works 
Questions of religious casuistry were addressed to him from all countries, and measures which he authorized had legal force among all the Jews of Europe.

Gershom's literary activity was similarly fruitful. He is celebrated for his works in the field of Biblical exegesis, the Masorah, and lexicography. His school composed glosses on the text of the Talmud, and wrote commentaries on several treatises of the latter which were very popular and gave an impulse to the production of other works of the kind. His  were inspired by the bloody persecutions of his time. Gershom also left a large number of rabbinical responsa, which are scattered throughout various collections.

He is the author of Seliha 42 – Zechor Berit Avraham ("Remember the Covenant of Abraham"), a liturgical poem recited by Ashkenazic Jews during the season of Rosh HaShana and Yom Kippur, which includes the following stanza:

Synod and bans 

He is famous for his religious bans within Judaism, which include:
 The prohibition of polygamy;
 The prohibition of divorcing a woman against her will;
 The modification of the rules concerning those who became apostates under compulsion;
 The prohibition of reading another person's private mail.
 
The influence of his ban can be seen in mail from the Middle Ages.  A letter would contain the seal "B'chadrag" which meant that it was forbidden to open except by the recipient under the ban of Rabbeinu Gershom.  His religious bans are still in force for Ashkenazi religious Jews and are used for establishment of law in modern Israel.

See also

References

Bibliography 

 Allgemeine Deutsche Biographie, vol. ix., Leipzig, 1879
 Chaim Azulai, Shem ha-Gedolim
 Bloch and Lévy, Histoire de la Littérature Juive, p. 310
 Histoire littéraire de la France, xiii. 2 et seq.
 Heinrich Grätz, Gesch. v. 405-407
 Leopold Zunz, Literaturgesch. pp. 238–239
 Eliakim Carmoly, La France Israélite, pp. 13–21
 Henri Gross, Gallia Judaica, pp. 299 et seq.

With regard to the so-called Ordinances of Rabbi Gershom see especially
 Rosenthal, in Jubelschrift zum Siebzigsten Geburtstag des Dr. Israel Hildesheimer. Berlin, 1890; pp. 37 et seq.

External links 
Video Lecture on Rabenu Gershom by Dr. Henry Abramson
 Rashi by Maurice Liber Biography of Rashi who carried Rabbenu Gershom's teachings into the medieval world. Discusses influence.

960s births
11th-century deaths
10th-century French rabbis
11th-century French rabbis
Rabbis from Metz
Authors of books on Jewish law